This is a list of notable kosher restaurants. A kosher restaurant is an establishment that serves food that complies with Jewish dietary laws (kashrut). These businesses, which also include diners, cafés, pizzerias, fast food, and cafeterias, and are frequently in listings together with kosher bakeries, butchers, caterers, and other similar places, differ from kosher-style establishments, which offer traditionally Jewish foods made from non-kosher ingredients (i.e., Katz's Delicatessen is kosher-style, meaning they sell all-beef frankfurters made from non-kosher beef).

Kosher restaurants typically operate under rabbinical supervision, which requires that kashrut, as well as certain other Jewish laws, must be observed.

Kosher restaurants

See also 

 American Jewish cuisine
 Israeli cuisine
 Jewish cuisine
 Kosher foods
 Kosher airline meal
 List of delicatessens
 List of Israeli dishes
 List of Jewish cuisine dishes
 List of restaurants in Israel
 Lists of restaurants
 List of kosher supermarkets

References

External links 
 

 
Lists of restaurants